The Carabineers (1963) was the fifth narrative feature film by French filmmaker Jean-Luc Godard.

Plot
Les Carabiniers (1963) tells the story of two poor men called to serve in battle, lured by promises of the world's riches. Ulysses (Marino Mase) and Michelangelo (Albert Juross) receive letters from the king of their fictional country that allow them to have complete freedom from consequence while fighting in the war, in return for anything they desire—swimming pools, Maseratis, women—at the enemy's expense.

Their wives, Venus and Cleopatra (Catherine Ribeiro and Genevieve Galea) encourage them to fight when they hear about the riches.  They leave and cross the battlefields and villages, destroying and pillaging as they wish. The pair's exploits are recounted through postcards sent to their wives, telling tales of the horrors of battle. The previously idealistic idea that the men have of war disintegrates, as they are still poor and now wounded. They return home with a suitcase full of postcards of the splendors of the world that they have fought for, and are told by army officials that they must wait until the war ends to receive their pay.

One day, the sky explodes with sparks, and the couples race into town, believing that the war has ended. Ulysses and Michelangelo are informed by their superiors that their king has lost the war, and that all of the war criminals must be punished. The two men are then shot for their crimes.

Critical responses
Writing about the film in Harpers Magazine in 1969, the critic Pauline Kael declared it, "hell to watch for the first hour...exciting to think about after because its one good sequence, the long picture-postcard sequence near the end, is so incredible and so brilliantly prolonged. The picture has been crawling and stumbling along and then it climbs a high wire and walks it and keeps walking it until we're almost dizzy from admiration. The tight rope is rarely stretched so high in movies..."

In popular culture
The renowned author and critic Susan Sontag referenced the film in her 1977 collection of essays On Photography. With respect to the "two sluggish lumpen-peasants" returning home bearing postcards of the treasures of the world instead of tangible treasure, Sontag noted that "Godard's gag vividly parodies the equivocal magic of the photographic image."

References

External links

1963 films
French war comedy-drama films
1960s French-language films
Films directed by Jean-Luc Godard
Anti-war films
Films set in a fictional country
Films produced by Carlo Ponti
1960s political films
1963 war films
1960s French films